Arracacia is a genus of flowering plant in the Apiaceae. It is native to the Americas, Mexico to Bolivia. The most important member of the genus economically is the arracacha, Arracacia xanthorrhiza.

There are about 41 species in the genus.

Species include:
Arracacia acuminata
Arracacia aegopodioides
Arracacia andina
Arracacia annulata
Arracacia anomala
Arracacia arguta
Arracacia atropurpurea
Arracacia bracteata
Arracacia brandegei
Arracacia brevipes
Arracacia chiapensis
Arracacia chirripoi
Arracacia colombiana
Arracacia compacta
Arracacia coulteri
Arracacia decumbens
Arracacia delavayi
Arracacia dissecta
Arracacia donnell-smithii
Arracacia dugesii
Arracacia ebracteata
Arracacia edulis
Arracacia elata
Arracacia equatorialis
Arracacia esculenta
Arracacia filiformis
Arracacia filipes
Arracacia fruticosa
Arracacia glaucescens
Arracacia guatemalensis
Arracacia hartwegii
Arracacia hemsleyana
Arracacia hintonii
Arracacia humilis
Arracacia incisa
Arracacia irazuensis
Arracacia kelloggii
Arracacia longipedunculata
Arracacia luxeana
Arracacia macvaughii
Arracacia mariana
Arracacia meyeri
Arracacia montana
Arracacia moschata
Arracacia multifida
Arracacia nelsoni
Arracacia nelsonii
Arracacia nudicaulis
Arracacia ovata
Arracacia papillosa
Arracacia pennellii
Arracacia peruviana
Arracacia peucedanifolia
Arracacia pringlei
Arracacia pubescens
Arracacia purpusii
Arracacia quadrifida
Arracacia ravenii
Arracacia rigida
Arracacia schiedei
Arracacia schneideri
Arracacia tapalpae
Arracacia tenuifolia
Arracacia ternata
Arracacia tillettii
Arracacia tolucensis
Arracacia vaginata
Arracacia vestita
Arracacia wigginsii
Arracacia xanthorrhiza

References

Apioideae
Apioideae genera